United Nations Security Council Resolution 1733, adopted by acclamation at a closed meeting on December 22, 2006, after recognising the role of the Secretary-General of the United Nations, the Council paid tribute to Kofi Annan, whose term as Secretary-General would come to an end on December 31, 2006.

Ban Ki-moon would succeed Annan as Secretary-General from January 1, 2007.

Details
The Council praised Annan for guiding the United Nations under the United Nations Charter, his attempts to find durable solutions to conflicts around the world and to undertake reforms at the organisation.

It acknowledged the contributions of Annan to international peace, security and development, attempts to solve
international problems in economic, social and cultural fields and efforts to promote humanitarian needs, human rights and freedoms for all people.

Finally, the resolution expressed "deep appreciation" to Kofi Annan for dedicating himself to the principles contained in the United Nations Charter and to the development of friendly relations among states.

See also
 List of United Nations Security Council Resolutions 1701 to 1800 (2006–2008)

References

External links
 
Text of the Resolution at undocs.org

 1733
 1733
December 2006 events